Empress Dowager Hu (胡太后) may refer to:

Empress Dowager Hu (Northern Wei) (died 528), empress dowager of the Northern Wei dynasty
Empress Dowager Hu (Northern Qi) ( 556–577), empress dowager of the Northern Qi dynasty

See also
Empress Hu (disambiguation)

Hu